Andrew W. Campbell (born 3 February 1984 in Toms River, New Jersey) is an American yachtsman.

Raised in Toms River, New Jersey, Campbell first learned to sail as a child in Toms River with the Barnegat Bay Yacht Racing Association and moved to San Diego, California at the age of eight. Campbell is the latest in a long lineage of sailing greats from the San Diego Yacht Club, in the unusual design of the Naples Sabot, commonly used for junior programs on the West Coast. He attended The Bishop's School in San Diego, CA suburb La Jolla.

In the Snipe class, he was the 2001 District 6 Junior Champion. In the Star class he won the silver medal in the 2013 World Championship and the 2010 European Championship.

College 
Campbell is the former Commodore of the Georgetown University Hoyas Sailing Team. At Georgetown, he led the #1 ranked Hoyas in the Inter-Collegiate Sailing Association National Championships by achieving three singlehanded national championships (2003, 2005 and 2006), a second-place finish in the coed dinghy national championship in 2004 in Hood River, Oregon, and a first-place finish at the 2006 team race national championship in Charleston, South Carolina. He was named an ICSA All-American four consecutive years, male Sailing Athlete of the Year in 2002 and 2005, and College Sailor of the Year in 2006.

Sports Illustrated placed him 10th on their list of Georgetown's Top 10 All-Time Athletes.

Olympics 
In September 2007 he won the men's Laser Olympic qualifiers in Newport, Rhode Island.

America's Cup 
He is the Flight Controller for American Magic, the New York Yacht Club entry at the 2021 America's Cup.

Personal life 
He currently lives in Washington, DC with his wife Jacqueline Campbell (née Schmitz).

References

1984 births
Living people
American male sailors (sport)
Olympic sailors of the United States
Sailors at the 2008 Summer Olympics – Laser
Pan American Games gold medalists for the United States
Sailors at the 2007 Pan American Games
Georgetown Hoyas sailors
Georgetown University alumni
ICSA College Sailor of the Year
Pan American Games medalists in sailing
Universiade medalists in sailing
People from Toms River, New Jersey
Universiade gold medalists for the United States
Medalists at the 2005 Summer Universiade
2021 America's Cup sailors
Medalists at the 2007 Pan American Games
Snipe class sailors
Star class sailors
American Magic